Alluvioni Piovera is a comune (municipality) in the Province of Alessandria in the Italian region Piedmont.

It was established on 1 January 2018 by the merger of the municipalities of Alluvioni Cambiò and Piovera.

References

Cities and towns in Piedmont